Sir James Wilfred Cook FRS  FRSE DSc LLD (1900–1975) was an English chemist, best known for his research of organic chemistry of carcinogenic compounds. Friends knew him simply as Jim Cook.

Life
He was born in South Kensington in London on 10 December 1900, the son of Charles William Cook, a coachman, and his wife, Frances Wall. Using a London County Council scholarship he attended Sloane School in Chelsea, London.

Cook studied Chemistry at University College, London under Frederick G. Donnan and Norman Collie. In 1920 he began lecturing at the Sir John Cass Technical Institute where he obtained his Ph.D. in 1923 with a thesis on the Anthracene derivative. He lectured at the Institute until 1928.

In 1929 Ernest Kennaway invited him to the Royal Cancer Hospital where he remained until 1939. Research done at the hospital suggested that tar (as found in most cigarettes) contained carcinogenic components of a similar structure to anthracene. Cook gathered pure samples of many polycyclic aromatic hydrocarbons, such as 1,2,5,6-dibenzoantracene, benzofenantrene 3.4-and 3.4-benzopyrene, and was therefore able to demonstrate for the first time that even a purely chemical compound had carcinogenic properties.

In 1939 he moved to Glasgow University as Regius Professor of Chemistry and Director of their chemical laboratories. He remained interested in carcinogenic compounds, but his focus now looked at compounds of natural origin. Central to his research was the clarification of the structure of Alkaloid Colchicine: a compound that has anti-cancer properties, but is also highly toxic. Searching for parallel but less toxic compounds, similar to colchicine, he synthesized and studied many artificially created compounds.

In 1954 he was appointed head of the University College of the South West of Exeter, which in 1955 was renamed the University of Exeter, with Cook then as Vice Chancellor. He continued to collaborate on research on polycyclic aromatic compounds with carcinogenic properties, isolated from crude oil and tobacco smoke.
He received multiple honorary doctorates: Dublin –DSc (1948) Nigeria – DSc (1961), Ulster – DSc (1970), Exeter – LLD (1967)

In 1965 he retired from the University of Exeter. Shortly afterwards his wife died, and Cook then decided to move to East Africa. In 1966 he became Vice Chancellor of the University of East Africa, which included colleges located in Kampala, Nairobi and Dar es Salaam. In 1970  the University of East Africa split to create three independent universities: Makerere University in Kampala (Uganda), the University of Nairobi (Kenya) and the University of Dar es Salaam (Tanzania).

In 1970 he returned to England, living in Exeter. He died suddenly on 21 October 1975.

Works
The scientific production of Cook includes about 240 articles in specialized journals. Among the various honors, in 1954 he won the highly prestigious Davy Medal of the Royal Society of London. In 1963 was knighted by Queen Elizabeth.

Notable committee memberships and positions
President of the Royal Institute of Chemistry 1949-51
University Grants Committee 1950-54
Committee on the Cost of the National Health Service 1956-59
Advisory Committee on Pesticides and Other Toxic Chemicals 1962-66

Family
He married twice. Firstly, in 1930 he married Elsie Winifred Griffith, with whom he had three children. Following her death in 1966 he remarried the following year, to Vera Elizabeth Ford, a biology teacher.

References

1900 births
1975 deaths
People from South Kensington
Academics of the University of Glasgow
Fellows of the Royal Society
Fellows of the Royal Society of Edinburgh
Principals of the University College of the South West of England
Vice-Chancellors of the University of Exeter
University of East Africa